Power of Temptation (German: Macht der Versuchung) is a 1922 German silent film directed by Paul L. Stein and starring Lil Dagover, Ilka Grüning and Arnold Korff.

Cast
In alphabetical order
Lil Dagover
Ilka Grüning
Arnold Korff
Theodor Loos
Paul Otto
Heinrich Schroth
Trude Singer

References

External links

Films of the Weimar Republic
Films directed by Paul L. Stein
German silent feature films
UFA GmbH films
German black-and-white films